Bengt Ronnie Peterson (14 February 1944 – 11 September 1978) was a Swedish racing driver. Known by the nickname 'SuperSwede', he was a two-time runner-up in the  Formula One World Drivers' Championship.

Peterson began his motor racing career in kart racing, traditionally the discipline where the majority of race drivers begin their careers in open-wheel racing. After winning a number of karting titles, including two Swedish titles in 1963 and 1964, he moved on to Formula Three, where he won the Monaco Grand Prix Formula Three support race for the 1969 Grand Prix. Later that year he won the FIA European Formula 3 Championship and moved up into Formula One, racing for the March factory team. In his three-year spell with the team, he took six podiums, most of which were scored during the 1971 Formula One season in which he also finished as runner-up in the Drivers' Championship.

After seeing out his three-year contract at March, Peterson joined Colin Chapman's Team Lotus in the 1973 season, partnering defending champion Emerson Fittipaldi. During his first two seasons with Lotus, Peterson took seven victories, scoring a career-best 52 points in 1973. After a poor 1975 season, Peterson moved back to March and scored his final victory for the team at the 1976 Italian Grand Prix. After spending the 1977 season with Tyrrell, he moved back to Lotus for the 1978 season as number two driver to Mario Andretti. Peterson scored two wins, at the South African and Austrian Grand Prix races, and finished second in the Drivers' Championship standings despite his fatal first-lap accident at Monza during the Italian Grand Prix.

Early life
Peterson was born in Almby in the vicinity of Örebro, Sweden. He developed his driving style at a young age while competing in karting, and rapidly worked his way up to the pinnacle of European karting before switching to cars.

Formulas Three and Two
After his karting years, Peterson entered Formula Three racing in the Svebe, a 1-litre, Brabham-derived Formula car he co-designed with his father Bengt (who was a baker) and Sven Andersson.

Superb results from the outset quickly attracted the attention of the ambitious Tecno company from Italy, who signed him in 1968. With them, he won the 1969 Formula Three Championship.

Even after his elevation to F1 status Peterson still drove in lower echelon racing series (which was common at the time), winning the 1971 European Formula Two Championship driving for March.

Formula One

Early years

Peterson made his Grand Prix debut in a March 701 for Colin Crabbe's works-supported Antique Automobiles Racing Team at the 1970 Monaco Grand Prix. The limited budget of Crabbe's privateer team allowed only minimal testing, and Peterson qualified 12th out of 16 cars in the race. He was 10 places behind Jackie Stewart and Chris Amon, both on the front row of the grid in their newer specification 701s, but only just behind the more experienced Jo Siffert in the second works March. Peterson was the only March driver to finish the race, in seventh place. In 1971 Peterson moved up to the full March works team, and made an instant impression. Five Formula One Grand Prix second places earned him the position of runner-up to Jackie Stewart in that year's World Championship. Within that year, Peterson drove in the World Sports Car Championship driving an Autodelta Alfa Romeo to win the Watkins Glen 6 hours. Peterson stayed at March until 1973, when he signed for John Player Team Lotus to partner Emerson Fittipaldi.

1973–1976

Peterson's first Grand Prix win was at the 1973 French Grand Prix, held at Paul Ricard, in a Lotus 72. He took three more wins that year, in Austria, Italy and the United States, but poor reliability restricted him to only third place in the World Championship at season's end.

For 1974, the Lotus 76 was brought forth. The car, however, proved to be a failure, disliked by both Peterson and his teammate Jacky Ickx. The team therefore opted to let them drive the much older Lotus 72s. Peterson did well in the old car and claimed three more victories: the French and Italian Grands Prix, as well as the Monaco Grand Prix.

1975 was a bad year for Lotus. Peterson and Ickx were forced to drive with the now archaic 72 model, whose age was now really beginning to show.

Peterson had signed for Shadow but Lotus owner Colin Chapman convinced him to stay with Lotus due to a promise Chapman made to accelerate the rate of development on the Lotus 77. He drove the first race of 1976 in the Lotus 77 before rejoining March Engineering. Driving the March 761, he won the Italian Grand Prix.

He also continued to drive sports cars, particularly for BMW in 1974 and 1975. For instance, he was paired with Hans-Joachim Stuck in a BMW 3.0 CSL for the South African "Wynn's 1000" in November 1975, where they started on pole but finished in second after a number of stops with engine vibrations, spark plug, and similar problems. Stuck and Peterson raced together for BMW in Europe, Africa, and also in North America.

1977: Tyrrell

In 1977, he raced for Tyrrell, driving the six-wheel Tyrrell P34B. Peterson retired from the opening four races of 1977, he spun off in Argentina, was involved in a crash with Jochen Mass's McLaren and Clay Regazzoni's Ensign in Brazil, and suffered fuel systems problems in South Africa and United States West. He finished eight in Spain but retired at Monaco with brake failure. Peterson's only podium finish was a third place at a rain-affected race in Belgium. Hopes were high at home in Sweden but Peterson retired with ignition problems and then finished 12th at France. He had an engine failure in Britain, finished ninth at Germany and got fifth in Austria. Peterson retired with ignition problems at Holland, sixth in Italy and 16th in the United States. Peterson retired from the last two races of 1977, a fuel leak in Canada and in Japan, he collided with Gilles Villeneuve's Ferrari but the crash killed a marshal and photographer as they were standing in a prohibited area of the track when the accident occurred.

1978: Lotus
Peterson surprised many by leaving Tyrrell to return to John Player Team Lotus for 1978.
He won the 1978 South African Grand Prix, with a last-lap victory over Patrick Depailler, as well as the Austrian Grand Prix, in the innovative 'ground effect' Lotus 79. His teammate Mario Andretti won the Drivers' Championship with Peterson acting effectively as the Team "No. 2" with the pair scoring four 1–2 wins, all with Andretti at the lead. Both of Peterson's wins occurred when Andretti encountered trouble, with Andretti winning once when Peterson failed to finish (not including the Italian Grand Prix). Many times, Peterson followed Andretti closely home, leading to speculation that 'Team Orders' were in place.

Throughout the 1970s Peterson had the reputation of being the fastest driver in F1 in terms of raw speed. During the 1978 season Andretti would frequently post the faster qualifying time. Another view, held by some contemporary observers, was that while Peterson may have in fact been the outright quicker of the two, it was Andretti's considerable car development skills that brought the recalcitrant Lotus 78 and 79 to full potential, and Peterson's seeming deference to Andretti was a tacit acknowledgement of this. Despite this, Peterson was offered a seat at McLaren at 1979. Peterson refused to contribute to any controversy, and on numerous occasions dismissed the speculation by stating that Andretti had simply turned the faster time.

Death

The 1978 Italian Grand Prix at Monza started badly for Peterson. In practice he damaged his Lotus 79 race car beyond immediate repair and bruised his legs in the process. Team Lotus had a spare 79, but it had been built for Andretti, and the much taller Peterson did not fit comfortably inside. The team's only other car was a type 78, the previous year's car, which had been dragged around the F1 circuit that season with minimal maintenance.

In the days after the race, many drivers on circuit stated that the race starter lit the green light for the race too early. Although a Formula One start is meant to be a standing start for all cars in the field, the early green light meant that cars in the rear rows were still rolling when the green light came on. This resulted in cars in the back getting a jump on those at the front, and an accordion effect as the cars approached the first chicane, bunching them tightly together. The front four, Andretti, Gilles Villeneuve, Jean-Pierre Jabouille and Niki Lauda, were far enough ahead to avoid any drama, but Peterson had made a poor start from the third row of the grid, and was immediately passed by Alan Jones, Jacques Laffite and John Watson.

Jody Scheckter and Riccardo Patrese, starting 10th and 12th, had moved to the right across the line that separated the Grand Prix front straight from the approach to the old Monza banking. While Scheckter's Wolf was able to rejoin the track well ahead of the bunching pack, Patrese moved back in just ahead of James Hunt, who feinted left and collided with Peterson, with Vittorio Brambilla, Carlos Reutemann, Hans-Joachim Stuck, Patrick Depailler, Didier Pironi, Derek Daly, Clay Regazzoni and Brett Lunger all involved in the ensuing melee.

Peterson's Lotus went into the barriers hard and caught fire before bouncing back into the middle of the track. He was trapped in the burning wreck, but Hunt, Regazzoni and Depailler managed to free him before he received more than minor burns, while track marshals were extinguishing the car. He was dragged free and laid in the middle of the track fully conscious, but with severe leg injuries. Hunt later said he stopped Peterson from looking at his legs to spare him further distress.

At the time there was more concern for Brambilla, who had been hit on the head by a flying wheel and was slumped comatose in his car. Brambilla was seriously hurt and did not race again in Formula One until a year later. Peterson's life was not seen to be in any danger. Sid Watkins and his medical team headed over to Brambilla's car to extract him from the wreckage. The injured drivers along with Peterson were taken to a hospital in Milan and the race was restarted when the track had been cleaned up.

At the hospital, Peterson's X-rays showed he had about 27 fractures in his legs and feet. After discussion with him, Peterson was sent to intensive care so that the surgeons could operate to stabilize the bones. There was some level of dispute between the doctors regarding whether all fractures should be immediately fixed or not. During the night, Peterson's condition worsened, and he was diagnosed with fat embolism. By morning he was in full kidney failure due to the embolism, and was declared dead at 9:55am on 11 September 1978.

His teammate Mario Andretti clinched the championship at the race. "It was so unfair to have a tragedy connected with probably what should have been the happiest day of my career", Andretti said, "I couldn't celebrate, but also, I knew that trophy would be with me forever. And I knew also that Ronnie would have been happy for me". Peterson took second place in the 1978 drivers' standings posthumously.

Peterson competed in 123 Grand Prix races during his career, winning ten of them.

At his funeral, the pallbearers included Åke Strandberg, James Hunt, Jody Scheckter, John Watson, Emerson Fittipaldi, Gunnar Nilsson and Niki Lauda.

Legacy
Peterson is considered by some to be one of the best Formula One drivers to have never won a championship, as well as the best racing driver from Sweden. In 2016, in an academic paper that reported a mathematical modeling study that assessed the relative influence of driver and machine, Peterson was ranked the 21st best Formula One driver of all time, and the sixth best to never win a title.

Arrows driver Riccardo Patrese was falsely blamed by several members of the Grand Prix Drivers' Association (mainly by James Hunt) with being a primary cause of the first lap wreck at the Italian Grand Prix. He was banned from competition for one race, from the 1978 United States Grand Prix.

In 1979, George Harrison paid tribute to Peterson with a song and music video called "Faster".

The circumstances of Peterson's death were prosecuted in an Italian criminal court. Driver Riccardo Patrese and race director Gianni Restilli were both charged with roles; Patrese, for manslaughter because of an unsafe maneuver on track which was considered to be a primary cause of the wreck, and Restilli, as contributing to Peterson's death by starting the race with a premature start signal. Both were cleared of criminal charges on 28 October 1981.

Peterson's widow Barbro (née Edwardsson) never got over his death and committed suicide on 19 December 1987. She was buried alongside Ronnie in the Peterson family grave in Örebro. She and Ronnie had a daughter named Nina Louise (named after Jochen Rindt's wife) who was born in November 1975.

There is a statue of Peterson in Örebro by Richard Brixel. The official Ronnie Peterson museum was officially opened by Ronnie's daughter, Nina Kennedy, in Örebro on 31 May 2008. The museum closed in October 2009 because it was unable to secure further government funding.

Superswede: A film about Ronnie Peterson (2017), directed by Henrik Jansson-Schweizer, with the participation of Mario Andretti, Emerson Fittipaldi, Nina Kennedy, and Niki Lauda, is available on YouTube, as are several other short tributes.

During the 2014 Monaco Grand Prix fellow Swedish Formula One driver Marcus Ericsson wore a special helmet in tribute to Peterson which was modeled on Peterson's. Ericsson wore a similar helmet en route to victory in the 2022 Indianapolis 500.

Racing record

Career summary

 Graded drivers not eligible for European Formula Two Championship points

Complete European Formula Two Championship results
(key) (Races in bold indicate pole position; races in italics indicate fastest lap)

 Graded drivers not eligible for European Formula Two Championship points

Complete Formula One World Championship results
(key) (races in bold indicate pole position; races in italics indicate fastest lap)

Non-Championship Formula One results
(key) (races in bold indicate pole position; races in italics indicate fastest lap)
(Races in italics indicate fastest lap)

24 Hours of Le Mans results

References
Journals

Internet
Nyberg, R. & Diepraam, M. 2000. Super Swede. 8W, January 2000.
Citations

External links
The Official Ronnie Peterson Website

1944 births
1978 deaths
International Race of Champions drivers
Racing drivers who died while racing
Swedish Formula One drivers
March Formula One drivers
Tyrrell Formula One drivers
Team Lotus Formula One drivers
Formula One race winners
Swedish Formula Three Championship drivers
European Formula Two Championship drivers
Sportspeople from Örebro
Swedish racing drivers
Sport deaths in Italy
24 Hours of Le Mans drivers
Swedish expatriates in Monaco
Swedish expatriates in the United Kingdom
Filmed deaths in motorsport
Deaths from embolism
Burials in Sweden
World Sportscar Championship drivers
Karting World Championship drivers